The Reef (also known as Passion's Way) is a 1999 American-Czech-German made-for-television historical drama film directed by Robert Allan Ackerman based on the book The Reef by Edith Wharton. It starred Sela Ward, Timothy Dalton, Alicia Witt, Jamie Glover. It was filmed in Prague, Czech Republic in 1996 but did not premiere on CBS until July 25, 1999.

Plot

In early 20th century France, a young widow renews her love with a man until she discovers that he had a past relationship with one of her new employees, who is a nanny. This makes the two women accuse each other for particular reasons until the end of the movie.

Cast
 Sela Ward - Anna Leath
 Timothy Dalton - Charles Darrow
 Alicia Witt - Sophy Viner
 Jamie Glover - Owen Leath
 Cynthia Harris - Adelaide
 Leslie Caron - Regine De Chantelle
 Hannah Taylor-Gordon - Effie Leath
 Rupert Frazer - Mr Farlow
 Jane Bertish - Mrs Farlow
 Robert Russell - Messenger

External links

1999 television films
1999 films
1999 romantic drama films
American romantic drama films
Czech romantic drama films
German romantic drama films
English-language Czech films
English-language German films
Films scored by Patrick Williams
Films based on American novels
Films based on works by Edith Wharton
Films set in 1912
Films set in France
CBS network films
Films directed by Robert Allan Ackerman
1990s American films
1990s German films